Brewster Place is an American drama series which aired on ABC in May 1990. The series was a spinoff of the 1989 miniseries The Women of Brewster Place, which was based upon Gloria Naylor's novel of the same name. The series starred talk show host Oprah Winfrey, who also served as co-executive producer.

Plot
Set in 1967, the series begin with events following the end of the 1989 miniseries, The Women of Brewster Place.  Mattie Michael (Oprah Winfrey) is fired from her job as a beautician, and agrees to purchase a neighborhood restaurant with her best friend Etta Mae (Brenda Pressley).  Kiswana (Rachel Crawford), Abshu (Kelly Neal), and Miss Sophie (Olivia Cole) are still residents of Brewster Place, and various other individuals move onto the block as the series progresses.

The series was filmed entirely in Chicago, on the lot of Winfrey's Harpo Productions.  It failed to capture the audience and critical acclaim of the miniseries, and was cancelled after a month. However, the full season of 11 episodes has since been released on both VHS and DVD.

Cast and crew
Oprah Winfrey as Mattie Michael
Rachael Crawford as Melanie "Kiswana" Browne
Brenda Pressley as Etta Mae Johnson
Olivia Cole as Miss Sophie
Kelly Neal as Abshu Kamau
John Cothran as Ralph Thomas
Oscar Brown Jr. as Jessie
John Speredakos as Mickey Adriano
Jason Weaver as Matthew Thomas

Ratings
Episode 1: 15.3 rating/21.9 million viewers
Episode 2: 13.2 rating
Episode 3: 9.7 rating
Episode 4: 10.1
Episode 5: 9
Episode 6: 7.6 rating/11.9 million viewers

Reception
Entertainment Weekly gave the series a grade of B−, and reviewed the show mildly favorably, stating, "There's something warm and comforting about Brewster Place, and something complacent and artificial as well."

References

External links 
 

1990s American drama television series
1990 American television series debuts
1990 American television series endings
American Broadcasting Company original programming
American television spin-offs
Television series set in the 1960s
Television series set in 1967
English-language television shows
Period television series
Television shows set in Chicago